William Jefferson Blythe Jr. (February 27, 1918 – May 17, 1946) was an Arkansas salesman of heavy equipment and the biological father of Bill Clinton, the 42nd president of the United States. Three months before his son was born, Blythe drowned following a car crash.

Personal life
William Jefferson Blythe Jr. was one of nine children born to William Jefferson Blythe (1884–1935), a farmer in Sherman, Texas, and his wife, the former Lou Birchie Ayers (1893–1946). Blythe Sr. was of English and Scottish descent, with a family tree in North America since the days of the thirteen colonies.

Blythe was married five times. He married for the first time in December 1935 to Virginia Adele Gash; they were divorced only thirteen months later. However, Virginia Gash and Blythe remained friends, and she visited him on occasion. A son was conceived during these visits, and Henry Leon Blythe was born in Sherman, Texas in January 1938, eighteen months after his parents had been divorced. 

Blythe married his second wife, 21-year-old Maxine Hamilton, in August 1938; they divorced two weeks later. 

Blythe next married Minnie Faye Gash, his first wife's sister, in December 1940. The marriage was annulled four months later in April 1941, without children. 
 
Shortly after the annulment on May 3, 1941, Blythe married again. His fourth wife was Wanetta Ellen Alexander of Kansas City, Missouri, and the wedding was held in Jackson County, Missouri. Wanetta gave birth to Blythe's daughter on May 11, 1941, eight days after their wedding. She had become pregnant with Blythe's child prior to his short-lived third marriage to Minnie. Their daughter, Sharon Lee Blythe Pettijohn, died on April 22, 2022. Blythe and Wanetta were formally divorced three years later, in April 1944, and lost touch immediately afterward. Wanetta, who eventually settled in Tucson, Arizona, had no inkling of Blythe's subsequent history until the presidential campaign of 1992 and a Washington Post story. Upon seeing old photographs of Bill Clinton's father flashed on TV, Wanetta "swears on a stack of Bibles ... that that was the man she was married to", said her son-in-law Bob Pettijohn, husband of her daughter Sharon.

Blythe's divorce from Wanetta was granted in court on April 13, 1944. Seven months prior on September 4, 1943, Blythe had bigamously married Virginia Dell Cassidy of Bodcaw, Arkansas. Blythe and Virginia remained married until his death in a car crash on May 17, 1946. Three months after Blythe's death on August 19, 1946, Virginia gave birth to their only child, William Jefferson Blythe III. Bill, as a teen, took his stepfather's surname and became known as Bill Clinton, the future 42nd president of the United States. Virginia Blythe-Clinton had no knowledge of Blythe's previous marriages until decades later when The Washington Post ran an extensive story in 1993, based on birth and marriage registry records, to mark Father's Day.

Blythe's eldest son, Henry Leon Blythe, never knew his biological father or paternal siblings. After their divorce, Virginia Gash moved to California and married first a man named Coffelt, then a man named Charles Ritzenthaler. She had lost touch with Blythe when their son was an infant, after he briefly married and then divorced her sister. Later in life, Henry Leon Blythe took the name Henry Leon Ritzenthaler in honor of his stepfather. Henry ran several small businesses in Paradise, California, including a janitorial business, dying in 2009. He was unaware of his connection to the future president until the presidential campaign of 1992, when an investigation by The Washington Post, based on birth registry records, revealed details of Bill Clinton's family. Ritzenthaler met his half-brother for the first time around that time, and the physical resemblance between the two was remarkable.

Career
Blythe was a traveling heavy equipment salesman for most of his brief career. It was while he worked as a travelling salesman that he met and married all his wives. After his fifth wedding in September 1943, Blythe shipped out for military service in World War II. He was stationed in Egypt and Italy. He worked in a motor pool as a mechanic, repairing jeeps and tanks. 

After the war ended, Blythe returned to Hope, Arkansas, to be with his wife. Shortly after he returned, he purchased a house in Chicago and readied it to receive his wife and expected child; he was apparently laying the ground for a more settled and conventional married life. Blythe moved to the new house in Chicago while Virginia remained behind in Hope. In Chicago, Blythe returned to his old job as a traveling salesman for the Manbee Equipment Company, which repaired heavy machinery. He died three months before the birth of his son.

Death
On May 17, 1946, while traveling from Chicago, Illinois, to Hope, Arkansas, Blythe lost control of his 1942 Buick on U.S. Route 60 outside of Sikeston, Missouri, after one of his car's tires blew out. He survived the crash after being thrown from the car, but drowned in a drainage ditch, there was only three feet (1 meter) of water in the ditch. Three months later, Blythe's widow, Virginia, gave birth to their son, whom she named William Jefferson Blythe III in honor of his father and grandfather. In 1950, Blythe's widow married Roger Clinton Sr.; 12 years later, Blythe's posthumous son legally adopted his stepfather's surname. He has a granddaughter, Chelsea Clinton, and 3 great-grandchildren.

Memorial
Blythe was buried at Rose Hill Cemetery in Hope, Hempstead County, Arkansas. In 1994, Virginia was interred beside him. In Clinton's 2004 autobiography, My Life, the elder Blythe was extensively mentioned, including a visit that Clinton made to the site where his father drowned.

See also
Clinton family

References

 Clinton, William Jefferson (2004). My Life. Hutchinson. . pp. 4–7.
 Hamilton, Nigel (2003). Bill Clinton: An American Journey: Great Expectations. Random House. 
 Maraniss, David (1996). First in His Class: Biography of Bill Clinton. Simon & Schuster. 
 Weingarten, Gene (June 1993). "The First Father". The Washington Post

External links
William Jefferson Blythe Jr. Gravesite - from The Cemetery Project

1918 births
1946 deaths
American salespeople
Accidental deaths in Missouri
American people of Scottish descent
American people of English descent
United States Army personnel of World War II
Burials in Arkansas
Family of Bill and Hillary Clinton
Deaths by drowning in the United States
People from Sherman, Texas
Road incident deaths in Missouri
Fathers of presidents of the United States
People from Paradise, California
United States Army soldiers